Rink's Womens Apparel Store, also known as the Rink Building, is a historic commercial building located at Indianapolis, Indiana.  It was built in 1910, and is a six-story, rectangular, steel frame building sheathed in clay tile and masonry. It measures approximately 120 feet by 70 feet and is four bays wide by seven long. It features large Chicago style window openings. The building housed the Rink's Womens Apparel Store, in operation until 1939.

It was listed on the National Register of Historic Places in 1984.  It is located in the Washington Street-Monument Circle Historic District.

References

Historic American Buildings Survey in Indiana
Individually listed contributing properties to historic districts on the National Register in Indiana
Commercial buildings on the National Register of Historic Places in Indiana
Commercial buildings completed in 1910
Commercial buildings in Indianapolis
National Register of Historic Places in Indianapolis
Chicago school architecture in Indiana